"In the Name of Love" is a song recorded by Dutch DJ and record producer Martin Garrix and American singer Bebe Rexha. The song was produced by Garrix, Matt Rad, Steve James and Simon Says. It was released on iTunes and streaming services after he premiered the song at Ultra Music Festival 2016. A remix EP was released on 11 November 2016, consisting of three remixes featuring DallasK, The Him and Snavs.

Background and composition
"In the Name of Love" is a future bass song, which contains "a combination of piano, bass, and guitar strums strums [which] provide percussion throughout demure verses".

Garrix and Rexha used FaceTime when she was recording the song as he was not in the studio initially. The two later gathered together to finish it.

Garrix debuted the song by playing it on his set in March 2016 at the Ultra Music Festival 2016. He announced the release of the song on 24 July 2016 via his social media accounts and a Tomorrowland 2016 interview. In an interview, he said the "album is finished" and this song would appear as the first single from his upcoming album on which he said he was working. It was the first track released since his deal with Sony Music which would also be distributed by the latter.

When asked why he chose Bebe Rexha for the collaboration, Garrix said, "First of all, I love to hear her voice. I met her earlier this year in LA. She played me some of her demos and just straight away after the first song, I fell in love with her voice because it's so unique it's so different. The team and I were brainstorming and then Bebe ended up doing it, with a lot of sending back and forth, lots of shaping and polishing the song and then we finally came up with the version how the world knows it right now."

Critical reception
Kat Bein of Billboard wrote that the song shows Garrix's artistic growth, "[it's] a far cry from the hard-hitting, stomp-ready beat of his breakthrough", and called the song "a charming track, as delicate as it is clean. It's Garrix sharing his softer side." Idolator's Rachel Sonis felt the song sounded "like the summer anthem we’ve been waiting for all along".

Music video
The official music video was released on Apple Music on 9 August 2016 and on YouTube on 23 August 2016. It was directed by Emil Nava. The video opens with Rexha wearing a red dress and red pvc thigh high boots by a swimming pool on a springboard outside a mansion, surrounded by rushes of smoke, storm clouds and water explosions just after Garrix comes into the scene by walking towards a springboard standing just few feet away from her. He holds Rexha as they sink beneath the surface of water. The video has over 700 million views as of July 2022.

Track listing

Charts

Weekly charts

Year-end charts

Certifications

References

External links
Song lyrics at Genius

2016 songs
2016 singles
Martin Garrix songs
Bebe Rexha songs
Future bass songs
Songs written by Martin Garrix
Songs written by Bebe Rexha
Songs written by Matt Rad
Songs written by RuthAnne
Songs written by Ilsey Juber
Stmpd Rcrds singles
Epic Records singles
Sony Music singles